Eastside Preparatory School is an independent school for upper and middle school students. It is located in Kirkland, Washington, US. It is a secular, coed, college-preparatory school for grades 5–12. The Head of School is Dr. Terry Macaluso.

History
Eastside Prep was founded in May 2002 by a group of parents and educators seeking more school choice, with a focus on interdisciplinary work and strategic thinking. Dr. Terry Macaluso, previously Head of School at Lakeside School, was a consultant to the founders and subsequently became the Head of School at Eastside Prep. The school opened its doors in September 2003 with 16 students in grades 6 and 7, along with 3 full-time and 1 part-time faculty. Eastside Prep graduated its first class of students in 2009.

Eastside Prep has expanded each year, adding students, faculty, administrators and buildings. At the beginning of the 2018–19 school year, the school has over 100 employees and over 480 students in grades 5–12.

In fall of 2015, Eastside Prep expanded, completing the construction of a new 4 story building (The Macaluso Academic Collaborative) that includes a gym, science labs, a design lab, an amphitheater and several multi-purpose classrooms.  In fall of 2018 the school's newest building (TALI Hall) opened.  TALI is a 50,000 square foot building housing a 500+-seat theatre, new art studios, a set shop, instrumental and choral music rooms, science labs, general purpose classrooms and administrative offices.

Academics

Eastside Preparatory School is accredited by the Northwest Association of Independent Schools, (NWAIS, formerly PNAIS). It is also a member of the National Association of Independent Schools and recognized by the Washington State Office of Superintendent of Public Instruction.

In addition to all courses required by the Washington State Graduation Requirements, Eastside Prep offers a multi-year Spanish curriculum, numerous core options and electives in the English, History, Social Sciences, Fine and Performing Arts, Mathematics, Sciences, Environmental Practices, Technology, Information Literacy and Media.

Afternoon activities at Eastside prep include teams for Math, Debate and FIRST Tech Challenge Robotics, as well as over twenty-five other student-driven clubs.

Eastside Prep dedicates multiple days every year to Service Learning.

Robotics 
Eastside Preparatory School has multiple robotics teams, in two separate leagues: FIRST Lego League for middle school students, and FIRST Tech Challenge (FTC) for students in 7th grade or higher. They have three FTC teams, a varsity team named Void Robotics, a varsity team named Null Robotics, and a junior varsity team named Undefined Robotics.

Null Robotics has won multiple awards. During the 2017–2018 season they most notably won the PTC Design Award. They won Tesla Interleauges in 2018.

All three teams design and machine their own parts through innovative methods such as 3D Printing and CNC Machining.

Athletics

In addition to Physical Education courses, Eastside Prep offers a number of afternoon sports. In 2012 the Eastside Prep Eagles opted up to the Emerald City League 1A athletic conference competing against much larger prep schools. In their league are The Bush School, The Overlake School, Seattle Academy of Arts and Sciences, University Prep, Northwest School, the Annie Wright School and the Forest Ridge School of the Sacred Heart.

Fall sports offered include Coed Crew (7th–12th), MS Boys Soccer (5th-8th), MS Girls Soccer (5th–8th), MS Coed Cross Country, MS Girls Volleyball, US Girls Volleball, US Boys Ultimate Frisbee.

Winter sports offered include 5th Grade Coed Basketball, MS Boys Basketball (6th–8th), MS Girls Basketball (6th–8th), US Boys Basketball, US Girls Basketball, Seasonal Ski Bus.

Spring sports include Coed Crew (7th–12th), MS Co-Ed Track and Field, MS Coed Ultimate Frisbee, MS Coed Tennis, US Co-Ed Track and Field, US Girls Ultimate Frisbee, US Boys Soccer.

Notes and references

External links
 

Schools in Kirkland, Washington
High schools in King County, Washington
Private middle schools in Washington (state)
Educational institutions established in 2002
Private high schools in Washington (state)
2002 establishments in Washington (state)